The 2010 PEI Labatt Tankard was held February 4-7 at the Western Community Curling Club in Alberton, Prince Edward Island. The winning Rod MacDonald team represented Prince Edward Island at the 2010 Tim Hortons Brier in Halifax, Nova Scotia.

Participating teams

Standings

Results

February 4
MacKenzie 10-7 Hope
Likely 8-4 Fetterly
MacDonald 8-3 Campbell
Likely 8-7 Campbell
MacDonald 7-4 Hope
MacKenzie 9-4 Fetterly

February 5
Campbell 7-5 MacKenzie
Hope 8-5 Fetterly
MacDonald 7-2 Likely
MacDonald 11-10 Fetterly (11)
MacKenzie 6-5 Likely
Campbell 6-4 Hope

Tie-breaker
February 6
Campbell 8-3 Likely

Playoffs

Semi-final
February 7

Final
February 7

External links
Coverage on Curlingzone.com
Official Site 

Labatt Tankard, 2010